Rydal Dam is a minor ungated homogeneous earthfill embankment dam with a fuse plug uncontrolled open channel spillway across an off stream storage, located near Rydal in the Central Tablelands region of New South Wales, Australia. The dam's purpose is to provide water storage for Delta power stations at Wallerawang and Mount Piper. The impounded reservoir is also called the Rydal Dam.

Location and features
The dam was built by WV Hall and Elliott on behalf of the New South Wales Department of Land and Water Conservation for industrial purposes.

Water from the Rydal Dam feeds the Fish River Water Supply, which is a unique regional water supply scheme and is the only scheme in eastern Australia to transfer western flowing water east of the Great Dividing Range. In addition to Rydal Dam, the scheme comprises Oberon Dam, a weir on the Duckmaloi River, a water treatment plant, and extensive pipeline network supplying water to Oberon, Portland, Mount Piper Power Station, Wallerawang town, Wallerawang Power Station, Lithgow and the Upper Blue Mountains. Lake Lyell and Lake Wallace, although officially not part of the scheme, also provide water storage for Wallerawang and Mount Piper power stations.

The uncontrolled open channel spillway with fuse plug is capable of discharging .

See also 

 Delta Electricity
 Fish River
 Lake Lyell
 List of dams and reservoirs in New South Wales
 Mount Piper Power Station
 Oberon Dam
 Wallerawang Power Station

References

Dams in New South Wales
Central Tablelands
Embankment dams
Dams completed in 1957
Rydal, New South Wales